Alonistaina is a mountain village in the municipal unit of Falanthos, Arcadia, Greece. It is situated in the forested northern Mainalo mountains, at about 1,220 m. elevation, making it one of the highest villages in the Peloponnese. It is considered a traditional settlement and is situated 6 km north of Piana, 6 km southeast of Vytina, 9 km southwest of Levidi and 18 km northwest of Tripoli. Alonistaina has a school and a church (Agia Paraskevi).

Description 
The village at 1150 m in the Mainalo mountains is one of the highest villages of Arcadia, Peloponnese. Kefalovriso is the largest karst spring in the area; it is dedicated to Saint Nicholas.

Historical population

Notable people 
 Birthplace of Zambia Kolokotroni-Kotsaki, mother of Theodoros Kolokotronis, a general in the Greek War of Independence.
 Birthplace of Theodoros Tourkovasilis, politician.

Notes

External links 
 Arcadia website

See also 
 Limestone
 List of settlements in Arcadia
 List of traditional settlements of Greece

Populated places in Arcadia, Peloponnese